Philipp Marceta (born 5 January 1993) is an Austrian footballer who plays as a goalkeeper.

Career

SV Heimstetten
Prior to the 2019-20 season, Marceta signed with Regionalliga club SV Heimstetten. During his only season with the club, Marceta made just one league appearance, playing the entirety of a 2-1 away defeat to Rain am Lech.

Forward Madison
During MLS pre-season, Marceta went on trial with the Seattle Sounders. However, he wasn't offered a contract. In March 2020, Marceta signed with USL League One club Forward Madison. He made his league debut for the club on 25 July 2020, playing the entirety of a 2-1 away defeat to North Texas SC.

References

External links

1993 births
Living people
Footballers from Vienna
FK Austria Wien players
First Vienna FC players
SC Ostbahn XI players
SC-ESV Parndorf 1919 players
Athlone Town A.F.C. players
SV Heimstetten players
SC Ritzing players
Forward Madison FC players
Regionalliga players
USL League One players
Austrian footballers
Association football goalkeepers
Austrian expatriate footballers
Austrian expatriate sportspeople in the United States
Austrian expatriate sportspeople in Germany
Expatriate soccer players in the United States
Expatriate footballers in Germany
Expatriate association footballers in Ireland